Levormeloxifene (developmental code names 6720-CDRI, NNC-460020) is a selective estrogen receptor modulator (SERM) which was being developed as an alternative to estrogen replacement therapy for the treatment and prevention of postmenopausal bone loss but did not complete development and hence was never marketed. The development was stopped because of a high incidence of gynecological side effects during clinical trials. Levormeloxifene is the levorotatory enantiomer of ormeloxifene, which, in contrast, has been marketed, though rather as a hormonal contraceptive.

See also
 List of selective estrogen receptor modulators

References

External links
 Levormeloxifene - AdisInsight

Abandoned drugs
Benzopyrans
Ethers
Pyrrolidines
Selective estrogen receptor modulators